George Thomas Johnston (born 1 September 1998) is a professional footballer who plays as a defender for League One club Bolton Wanderers. Born in England, Johnston represents Scotland at youth international level.

Career

Liverpool
Johnston came through the Academy at Liverpool, making one first-team appearance in a preseason friendly against Torino at Anfield in August 2018.

Feyenoord
In August 2019, he moved to Feyenoord on a permanent deal. Feyenoord paid Liverpool £300,000, and the deal included a 30% sell-on clause.

Wigan Athletic (loan)
On 22 January 2021, Johnston joined League One side Wigan Athletic on loan for the remainder of the 2020–21 season. He scored his first goal for Wigan in a 3–0 win against Milton Keynes Dons on 6 March 2021.

Bolton Wanderers
On 4 June 2021, Johnston returned to League One, this time joining Bolton Wanderers on a three-year deal. He turned down Wigan to join Bolton. His competitive debut came on 7 August in a 3–3 draw against Milton Keynes Dons, where he made a goal line clearance. He has gone on to score 2 goals for the club.

International career
Johnston has represented Scotland at under-20 and under-21 level.

Career statistics

Club

References

1998 births
Living people
English people of Scottish descent
English footballers
Scottish footballers
Scotland under-21 international footballers
Scotland youth international footballers
Association football defenders
Liverpool F.C. players
Feyenoord players
Wigan Athletic F.C. players
Bolton Wanderers F.C. players 
Eredivisie players
English expatriate footballers
Scottish expatriate footballers
English expatriate sportspeople in the Netherlands
Scottish expatriate sportspeople in the Netherlands
Expatriate footballers in the Netherlands